Mümtaz Sevinç (9 February 1952 in Elazığ – 24 January 2006 in Istanbul) was a Turkish actor who had taken part in theater acting as well as many roles in TV's and movies. He graduated from Hacettepe University, Faculty of Engineering Physics Department and in 1978 began working in the State Theater. In 1994, he began to take part in Istanbul State Theater. He died on the 24 January 2006. in Istanbul, Turkey.

Filmography

Actor
 Sev kardesim (2006) TV mini-series 
 Nehir (2005) TV mini-series .... Sait 
 Askimizda ölüm var (2004) TV mini-series .... Yusuf Akdogan 
 Sihirli annem (2003) TV mini-series .... Umur 
 Emanet (2002) TV mini-series 
 Çifte bela (2001) TV mini-series .... Osman 
 Sehnaz tango (2000) TV series .... Ziya 
 Gülün bittigi yer (1999) 
 Hayal kurma oyunlari (1999) .... Kayinbirader 
 Hosçakal yarin (1998) .... Sikiyönetim Avukati ... aka Goodbye Tomorrow (USA) 
 Deli divane (1997) TV series .... Beyefendi 
 Kurtulus (1994) TV mini-series .... Gen. Ali Fuat Pasa 

Self
 Bir yudum insan-Ayhan Isik (1998) (TV) (voice) .... Narrator 
 Bir yudum insan-Can Yücel (1998) (TV) (voice) .... Himself

References

External links
 

Turkish male film actors
Turkish male television actors
1952 births
2006 deaths
20th-century Turkish male actors